Liga IV is the fourth level of the Romanian football league system and is run in all 41 counties and in the Municipality of Bucharest. It was known as the Regional Championship, County Championship, Divizia C – County Phase and Divizia D. Its name was changed into Liga IV before the start of the 2006–07 season.

History

1950–1968 
Starting with 1950, the Romanian People's Republic was administratively and territorially reorganized into regions and districts, each region having its own football championship. Between 1950-1956 and 1960-1963 it was the third tier in the Romanian football league system, as Divizia C was disbanded in those two periods.

Current format 
Liga IV has 42 divisions.  The divisions are regionalised and are organised by every county association. Each team plays in their own county. The county associations decide how many teams play in the league and how many matches each side plays. In Romania the most frequently used system is one division with matches played home and away. A number of associations prefer 2 or even 4 parallel divisions with the teams finishing first meeting in a play-off to decide the champion. The number of teams differ from one county association to another. The Mureș County association has the fewest teams, 8, which play in a Scottish system, playing 4 times against one another. The Dolj County association has 20 teams.

Promotion 
The champions of each county association play one another in a play-off to determine 21 teams that will promote to Liga III. Geographical criteria are taken into consideration when the play-offs are drawn. In total there are 41 county champions plus the Bucharest municipal champion.

At this level teams are not considered full fledged clubs but instead are "sporting associations". However teams that want to promote have to get a certificate declaring them to be a football club from the  national federation.

Series 
Liga IV is divided in 42 series, one for each county. All county leagues are organized individually by every County Football Association (AJF), but under the supervision of the Romanian Football Federation.

North–East
  Liga IV Bacău
  Liga IV Botoșani
  Liga IV Iași
  Liga IV Neamț
  Liga IV Suceava
  Liga IV Vaslui

North–West
  Liga IV Bihor
  Liga IV Bistrița-Năsăud
  Liga IV Cluj
  Liga IV Maramureș
  Liga IV Satu Mare
  Liga IV Sălaj

Center
  Liga IV Alba
  Liga IV Brașov
  Liga IV Covasna
  Liga IV Harghita
  Liga IV Mureș
  Liga IV Sibiu

West
  Liga IV Arad
  Liga IV Caraș-Severin
  Liga IV Gorj
  Liga IV Hunedoara
  Liga IV Mehedinți
  Liga IV Timiș

South–West
  Liga IV Argeș
  Liga IV Dâmbovița
  Liga IV Dolj
  Liga IV Olt
  Liga IV Teleorman
  Liga IV Vâlcea

South
  Liga IV Bucharest
  Liga IV Călărași
  Liga IV Giurgiu
  Liga IV Ialomița
  Liga IV Ilfov
  Liga IV Prahova

South–East
  Liga IV Brăila
  Liga IV Buzău
  Liga IV Constanța
  Liga IV Galați
  Liga IV Tulcea
  Liga IV Vrancea

Notable teams (2022–23)

Argeș County
 ARO Muscelul Câmpulung
Bacău County
 Gauss Bacău
 Moinești
Bihor County
 Bihorul Beiuș
 CA Oradea
 Luceafărul Oradea
 Olimpia Salonta
 Oșorhei
Brăila County
 Făurei
Bucharest Municipality
 Daco-Getica București
 Venus București
Călărași County
 Oltenița
Cluj County
 Speranța Jucu
 Sticla Arieșul Turda
Constanţa County
 Axiopolis Cernavodă
 Medgidia
 Năvodari
 Ovidiu
 Portul Constanța

Giurgiu County
 Dunărea Giurgiu
Gorj County
 Minerul Motru
 Pandurii Târgu Jiu
Hunedoara County
 Dacia Orăștie
 Minerul Lupeni
 Minerul Uricani
 Vulcan
Ialomița County
 Fetești
 Viitorul Axintele
Iași County
 Pașcani
Ilfov County
 Balotești
 Brănești
 Clinceni
 Olimpic Snagov
Maramureș County
 Academica Recea
Mureș County
 ASA Târgu Mureș
Neamț County
 CSM Roman

Olt County
 Olt Scornicești
Prahova County
 Brazi
 Boldești-Scăeni
 Tricolorul Breaza
Satu Mare County
 Oașul Negrești-Oaș
 Olimpia Satu Mare
Sibiu County
 Inter Sibiu
 Mediaș 2022
 LSS Voința Sibiu
Timiș County
 Lugoj
 Unirea Sânnicolau Mare
Vâlcea County
 Râmnicu Vâlcea

See also 
 Liga I
 Liga II
 Liga III

References

External links
 Official website 

 
4
Rom
Professional sports leagues in Romania